Sauda Rajab is a Kenyan female corporate executive, who serves as the chief executive officer of Precision Air, a privately owned regional airline, based in Tanzania, rendering services in the countries of the African Great Lakes.

Background and education
She was born in Kenya's port-city of Mombasa, circa 1964. When the children were still young, their parents divorced, which led to their single father raising them. She graduated from the University of Nairobi and received post graduate training and education from he London Business School and the University of Pretoria.

Career
In 1989, Sauda Rajab was hired as a management trainee at the government-owned (30 percent as of September 2015), Kenya Airways . During the pre-hiring interview, she informed the panel of her desire to lead an airline some day, correctly predicting the future.

Over the next 24 years, she rose through the ranks. She held several high profile positions at KQ along the way, including as (a) General Manager for Kenya, (b) Regional General Manager for Europe, the Americas and Asia and her last position at KQ was as (c) General Manager for Cargo.

On 1 March 2013, she was appointed as the Managing Director and Chief Executive Officer of Precision Air , where KQ owns 41.23 percent shareholding, as of 31 March 2016. Since her arrival at PW, she has instituted changes and is credited with partial recovery at the airline.

Other considerations
As managing director and CEO, she sits on the board of directors of PW, effective March 2013. As of March 2017, Sauda Rajab was one of a minimal number of women chief executives of private and public airlines in the world.

See also
 Rebecca Miano
 MaryJane Mwangi

References

External links
 Website of Precision Air
 Precision Air's CEO Puts The Record Straight As at 18 November 2013.

Living people
1964 births
21st-century Kenyan businesswomen
21st-century Kenyan businesspeople
Kenyan Muslims
University of Nairobi alumni
Alumni of the University of London
University of Pretoria alumni
Kenyan women business executives
Kenyan chief executives